Joel Senior is the name of:

Joel Senior (footballer, born 1987), Jamaican footballer
Joel Senior (footballer, born 1999), English footballer